was a town located in Higashiyamanashi District, Yamanashi Prefecture, Japan. As of 2003, the town had an estimated population of 5,797 and a density of 56.92 persons per km². The total area was 101.85 km².

History 
On March 22, 2005 Makioka and Mitomi (also from Higashiyamanashi District) merged into the expanded city of Yamanashi.

References

External links
 Yamanashi official website 

Dissolved municipalities of Yamanashi Prefecture
Yamanashi, Yamanashi